Suryaputra Karn is an Indian historical epic television series, which premiered on 29 June 2015 on Sony Entertainment Television (India) and Sony Entertainment Television Asia. The show aired Monday through Friday nights at 8:30 PM. Produced by Siddharth Kumar Tewary of Swastik Pictures, the series covers the life journey of Karna in the Mahabharata. The show starred Gautam Rode (adult Karna), Vishesh Bansal (young Karna) and Basant Bhatt (teenage Karna) as the lead character at various stages of his life.

Premise
The story revolves around one of the best archer of the Mahabharata, Karna and narrates the entire story of Mahabharata from Karna and Pandavas' birth to the eventual crowning of Karna in the Swarga. The show covers the life journey of Karna on his way to becoming a great warrior.

He was the son of Surya and Kunti. He was born to Kunti before her marriage with Pandu. Kunti thus abandoned him. He was then saved by Adhirath, who was a charioteer. Karna since his childhood only decided to become an archer. He learnt archery from Lord Parshurama and lied him about his identity of being a Brahmin. But his lie was soon discovered and Parshurama cursed him.

After that Duryodhana made him the king of Anga and befriended him. Later, he along with Shakuni, devised a plan to insult Draupadi, wife of the Pandavas. They arranged a gambling where Yudhishthir lost all of his properties including Draupadi. Duryodhana asked Dushasan to disrobe her but failed as Lord Krishna saved her dignity. The Pandavas and Draupadi were sent for an exile of 13 years. This sowed the seeds of Mahabharata war.

Indra, in disguise of a Brahmin took Karna's armour and earrings. Later, he learned his true identity of Kunti and Surya's son but he decided to fight for Duryodhana blaming Yudhishthir for owing Draupadi. The Mahabharata war resulted in the death of Karna, Bheeshma, Drona, and many of the Kauravas. Thus, the Pandavas won the war. Yudhishthir was made the king of Hastinapura.

Gandhari cursed Krishna for destroying Kuru Vansh. Her curse showed result after 36 years and Krishna's dynasty also got destroyed. A hunter named Jara killed Krishna mistakenly. Thus, the Pandavas decided to go to heaven where they met the Kauravas and Karna. The show ended with Krishna's blessings to everyone.

Cast

Main

 Gautam Rode as Karna: Biological son of Surya and Kunti, Pandavas' elder brother, Adhiratha and Radha's adopted son, Vrushali and Supriya's husband, Duryodhana's friend and the King of Anga; Vrishasena and Vrishaketu's father
 Vrishaketu – Karna and Vrushali's son, later the King of Anga
 Basant Bhatt as teenage Karna and teenage Vrishasena: Karna and Supriya's son
 Vishesh Bansal as child Karna
 Farnaz Shetty as Vrushali: Karna's childhood friend-turned-first wife; Vrishaketu's mother

Recurring 
 Saurabh Pandey as Lord Krishna: Devaki and Vasudeva's son; Nanda and Yashoda's adopted son; Karna, Draupadi and Arjuna's friend
 Priya Bathija as Kunti: Kuntibhoj's daughter; wife of Pandu; Karna's biological mother; Yudhisthira, Bhima, Arjuna, Nakula and Sahadeva's mother; Balarama and Krishna's paternal aunt; Queen Mother of Hastinapura
 Kanan Malhotra as Yudhisthira: Dharmaraj, Kunti and Pandu's son, first Pandava, Draupadi's husband, Prativindhya's father, King of Indraprastha and later King of Hastinapura
 Shaleen Bhanot as Duryodhana: Dhritarashtra and Gandhari's first son, eldest of the Kauravas, Crown Prince of Hastinapura, Karna's best friend, Bhanumati's husband and Laxmankumar, Lakshamana, and more sons / daughters's father
 Yash Rajendra Karia as teenage Duryodhana
 Ajay Jayram as Shakuni: Gandhari's brother, Kauravas's maternal uncle, Duryodhana's accomplice who is an expert in gambling
 Richa Mehta as teenage Vrushali
 Navi Bhangu as Arjuna: Indra, Kunti and Pandu's son, third Pandava, Draupadi and Subhadra's husband; Abhimanyu and Shrutkarma's father, Karna's arch rival
 Basant Bhatt as Vrishasena: Karna and Supriya's eldest son and died on the third day of war by Arjuna.
 Pankhuri Awasthy Rode as Draupadi: Dhrupad's daughter, Dhrishtadyumna's sister, Pandavas's common wife, Queen of Indraprastha and later Queen of Hastinapura, mother of Upapandavas
 Ketan Karande as Bhim: Vayu, Kunti and Pandu's son, second Pandava, Hidimba and Draupadi's husband, Ghatotkach and Sutasoma's father
 Buneet Kapoor as Nakula: Ashwinikumars, Madri and Pandu's son, fourth Pandava, Draupadi's husband, Shatanika's father
 Suchit V. Singh as Sahadeva: Ashwinikumars, Madri and Pandu's son, fifth Pandava, Draupadi's husband, Shrutasena's father
 Sandeep Rajora / Farooq Saeed as Surya – Karna's biological father
 Mouli Ganguly / Hemaakshi Ujjain as Radha - Karna's foster mother, Shona's mother, Adhirath's wife
 Anand Suryavanshi as Adhirath - Karna's foster father, Shon's father, Radha's husband, Bhishma's charioteer
 Babloo Mukherjee as Ucchasena - Adhirath's brother, Radha's brother-in-law, Karna and Shon's uncle 
 Ujjawal Gauraha as Visheshan - King of Sut Society where karna was raised in childhood
 Aditya Kapadia as Shon - Karna's foster brother
 Uzair Basar as child Shon
 Malika Juneja as Supriya - Karna's second wife, Vrishasena's mother
 Riva Bubber as Priyamvada - Kunti's maid
 Daya Shankar Pandey as Shani - Surya's son, Karna's brother
 Rumi Khan as Madhyam
 Hirdeyjeet Jarnail Singh as Vrishbhan - Vrushali's father
 Naved Aslam as Bhishma - Great-uncle (grandfather figure) of Pandavas and Kauravas, Shantanu and Ganga's son
 Aditi Govitrikar as Ganga- Bhishma's mother, Shantanu's wife
 Paras Thukral as Dhritarashtra - King of Hastinapur, Ganchari's husband, father of the Kauravas and Dushala
 Smriti Sinha Vatsa as Gandhari - Shakuni's sister, Dhritarashtra's wife, Queen of Hastinapura, mother of the Kauravas and Dushala
 Anuj Sharma as Vidur - Younger brother Dritarashtra and Pandu, Prime Minister of Hastinapura
 Nimai Bali as Dronacharya - Guru of Pandavas and Kauravas, Ashwathama's father
 Kunal Bakshi as Ashwatthama - Son of Dronacharya and Kripi,Duryodhana's friend,Student of Dronacharya too
 Surendra Pal as Parshuram - Guru of Bhishma, Drona and Karna
 Sachin Verma as Indra - King of the Devtas, Arjun's father
 Jay Thakkar as child Dushasan
 Shubhi Ahuja as Bhanumati - Duryodhana's wife, mother of Lakshmanaa (and Lakshmana Kumar) 
 Raj Premi as Drupad - King of Panchala; Shikandini, Drishtadymna and Draupadi's father
 Payal Rohatgi as Shikhandini/Shikhandi - Daughter of Drupad, Dristadyumna and Draupadi's elder sister
 Vicky Batra / Akash Sharma as Dhrishtadyumna - Drupad's son, Shikandini and Draupadi's brother
 Vikramjeet Virk as Jarasandha - King of Magadha
 Dinesh Mehta as Jayadratha - Dushala's husband, Kauravas' brother-in-law
 Deblina Chatterjee as Urvashi
 Karan Sharma as Virata - King of the Matsya kingdom, Sudeshna's husband, Uttara and Uttar's father 
 Jaswinder Gardner as Sudeshna - Virata's wife, Queen of the Matsya kingdom, Uttara and Uttar's mother
 Meghan Jadhav as Abhimanyu - Arjun and Subhadra's son, Krishna and Balarama's nephew, Uttara's husband
 Alice Kaushik as Uttarā - Virat and Sudeshna's daughter, Uttar's sister, Abhimanyu's wife, Parikshit's mother
 Ashwin Patil as Uttar - Virat and Sudeshna's son, Uttara's brother
 Zohaib Siddiqui as Kichaka - Sudeshna's brother, Commander-in-chief of the Matsya kingdom army
 Malhar Pandya as Balarama - Krishna's elder brother 
 Richa Mukherjee as Lakshmanaa - Duryodhana and Bhanumati's daughter, Samba's wife, Krishna's daughter-in-law
 Aayush Shah/Shresth Kumar as Samba - Krishna's son, Lakshmanaa's husband
 Aniruddh Dave as Shishupala
 Tarakesh Chauhan as Vishwakarma
 Kaushik Chakravorty as Shalya - Pandavas' maternal uncle, King of Madra
 Vikram Soni as Prativindhya - Yudishtira and Draupadi's son
 Ayush Shrivastava as Shrutkarma - son of Arjun and Draupadi 
 Akbar Ali as Ghatotkach - Bheem and Himdimba's son
 Vashu Chauhan as Barbareek - Ghatotkach's son
 Aishwarya Sharma as Urvashi

Production
Karanvir Bohra, Karan Grover, Karan Tacker, Avinesh Rekhi and Aditya Redij were approached for playing the lead role of Karna, but Gautam Rode was signed for the eponymous role. In 2015, Gautam Rode won the Best Actor in a Historical Serial award in Indian Telly Awards for the show. The show was intended to be a finite series of 150 episodes but was extended up to August due to a rise in the ratings.

Awards

Versions
This show is also dubbed in Telugu as Suryaputra Karna (Telugu: సూర్యపుత్ర కర్ణ) and airing in ETV Telugu from 30 May 2021.

References

External links
 

Sony Entertainment Television original programming
2015 Indian television series debuts
2016 Indian television series endings
Television series based on Mahabharata
Swastik Productions television series